María Teresa Correa Ávila (born 9 October 1949), professionally known as María Teresa Costantini, is an Argentine film actress, screenwriter and film director who has appeared in films since 1989.

Life
She is the daughter of Lía Susana López Naguil and Carlos Correa Ávila, who served as ambassador and official in the first government of Juan Domingo Perón. Due to her father's work, Teresa lived most of her childhood and youth outside Argentina, in Italy, England and the United States. At the age of 17 she married businessman and art collector Eduardo Costantini.

Filmography
Costantini's films include:
 I Never Been in Vienna (1989) (actress)
 Of Love and Shadows (1994) (actress)
  (short film, 1997) (writer and director)
  (2000) (writer and director)
  (English: "Without Break") (2002) (director)
  (2006) (writer and director)
  (2009) (writer and director)

References

 Mario Di Nicola (n.d.). Teresa Costantini – Actriz – Productora- Guionista y Directora de Cine (in Spanish). 160 Arte y cultura. Accessed August 2013.
 index-2 (in Spanish). Buenos Aires Producciones. Accessed August 2013.
 Teresa Costantini (in Spanish). www.cinenacional.com. Accessed August 2013.
 Gaspar Zimerman (6 November 2008). Felicitas: la mujer más bella de Argentina (in Spanish). Clarín.com. Accessed August 2013.

External links

1949 births
Living people
Actresses from Buenos Aires
Argentine film actresses
Argentine film directors
Argentine screenwriters
Argentine women film directors